The Turks in Egypt, also referred to as Egyptian Turks, Turkish-Egyptians and Turco-Egyptians are Egyptian citizens of partial or full Turkish ancestry, who are the descendants of settlers that arrived in the region during the rule of several Turkic dynasties, including: the Tulunid (868–905), Ikhshidid (935–969), Mamluk (1250–1517), and Ottoman (1517–1867 and 1867–1914) eras. Today their descendants continue to live in Egypt and still identify as Egyptians of Turkish or mixed origin, though they are also fully integrated in Egyptian society.

History

Mamluk era

Ottoman era

During the four centuries of Ottoman rule, Turkish settlers arrived predominately from Anatolia; however, many also arrived from the Ottoman Isles (such as the Aegean islands, Crete, and Cyprus), as well as from prominent Ottoman cities (such as Istanbul, Algiers, and Tunis).

In 1833 one estimate claimed that the Turkish population in Egypt was 30,000; however, in 1835, the Missionary Herald newspaper claimed that the population [of Ottoman Egypt] is of a mixed character, the great mass being Arabic language speaking Muslims, and a minority of Turkish speakers who belonged to the Ottoman ruling-class. Similarly, in 1840, The Saturday Magazine series claimed that Egypt's population was only about two million and a half, the majority of whom are of Arabic speaking masses and Ottoman ruling class. This study is widely discredited and has no scientific basis.

By 1878 the Karl Baedeker Firm published a census stating that the population of Egypt "hardly exceeds 5 millions" and that the population of Turkish origin numbered barely 100,000 (accounting to approximately 2% of the population), mainly concentrated to the towns.

Post-Ottoman era
Prior to the Egyptian revolution in 1919, the ruling elite were mainly Turkish, or of Turkish descent, which was part of the heritage from the Ottoman rule of Egypt. The ethnic affiliation in Egypt at this time was still blurry; however, Amal Talaat Abdelrazek describes the Turkish society in Egypt with the following words:

Culture

Language
During the Ottoman rule of Egypt, the region was ruled directly by Turkish-speaking elites. Consequently, the lexical Turkish influence of Egyptian Arabic has been clearer and more consistent than in Levantine Arabic, especially the formal terms like Pasha and Bek which are still used till today in daily conversations. Today, many Turkish lexical items (and Persian borrowings through Turkish) have been firmly integrated into Egyptian Arabic.

Population
According to an article by Gamal Nkrumah in the Egyptian Al-Ahram Weekly, estimates regarding the population of the Turkish minority vary considerably, ranging from 100,000 to 1,500,000. However, one estimate in 1971 suggested that the population of Cretan Turks alone numbered 100,000 in Egypt. Moreover, another estimate in 1993 claimed that the Turkish minority in Egypt numbered 1.5 million at the time.

See also 

List of Egyptian people of Turkish descent
History of Ottoman Egypt
Egypt in the Middle Ages
Turkish minorities in the former Ottoman Empire
Turks in the Arab world
 Iraqi Turkmens
 Syrian Turkmens
 Turks in Algeria
 Turks in Lebanon
 Turks in Tunisia 
 Oghuz Turks
 Egypt–Turkey relations

References

Bibliography

 
 
 
 
 
 
 
 
 

 
 
 
 
 
 
 
 
 

Ethnic groups in Egypt
Asian diaspora in Egypt
Egypt
Egypt
Egypt
 
Egypt